The Hamburg derby or Hamburger Stadtderby is a football rivalry between two major Hamburg sides, Hamburger SV and FC St. Pauli.

In total, the two sides met 107 times since 1919, of which Hamburger SV won 68 games and FC St. Pauli won 23 games. Earlier games between Hamburger SV, its predecessors SC Germania, Hamburger FC and FC Falke 1906, and St. Pauli TV are not counted here. Hamburger SV was formed from a merger in 1919, and FC St. Pauli was formed as a separate football side through a divorce with St. Pauli TV in 1924.

History 
Hamburger SV was founded when SC Germania of 1887, Hamburger FC of 1888 and FC Falke 1906 merged in 1919 (the date of SC Germania's founding is the official club foundation year given as 1887). FC St. Pauli emerged in 1924 as a spin-off from the Hamburg St. Pauli Turnverein gymnastics club. After its foundation, Hamburger SV rose to become the largest club in the city, and after the Second World War, FC St. Pauli replaced Eimsbütteler TV as a competitor of "HSV".

The first match between HSV and St. Pauli TV was played on 7 December 1919 in the "Hamburg Championship", Hamburger SV won this match 9-0. The first win for FC St. Pauli, whose nickname is "Kiezkicker", came on 19 October 1930, when they won 1-0 in their first encounter in the "Oberliga Hamburg". Matches between Hamburger SV and FC St. Pauli were played almost every year before the two sides parted ways after the Bundesliga was founded in 1963: HSV became the record champions of the Oberliga Nord in the Bundesliga, while FC St. Pauli played in the Regionalliga Nord. In 1974, they moved up to the newly founded 2. Bundesliga and in 1977, they succeeded in advancing to the Bundesliga, making this the first Hamburg city derby to be held in the Bundesliga. In the previous season, the 1976/77 season, HSV won the 1976-77 European Cup Winners' Cup and was therefore considered the favourite. Nevertheless, FC St. Pauli won the match in the Volksparkstadion, the home ground of HSV, 2-0. The return match was also played in the Hamburger SV stadium, although FC St. Pauli was the home team. HSV won this match 3-2, and FC St. Pauli retired from the Bundesliga at the end of the 1977/78 season. The next clash occurred in the 1986/87 season, when Hamburger SV played FC St. Pauli in the DFB Cup. HSV won 6-0 in their own stadium.

From 1988 to 1991, from 1995 to 1997 and in the 2001-02 season, FC St. Pauli played in the Bundesliga again, playing the city derbies, in which they had home rights, in the Volksparkstadion. Out of a total of 12 games, they were unable to win any of them (five draws, seven defeats). After FC St. Pauli was relegated to the 2. Bundesliga at the end of the 2001-02 season, they even had to play in the Regionalliga Nord in 2003. In 2007 FC St. Pauli returned to the 2. Bundesliga, and in 2010 the "Kiezkickers" finally made it back to the Bundesliga. The first leg on 19 October 2010 was the first game since 1962 to be played in an FC St. Pauli stadium. This ended with a 1-1 draw. In the return match on 16 February 2011 in the Volksparkstadion, FC St. Pauli won 1-0 through Gerald Asamoah's goal, it was FC St. Pauli's first win against Hamburger SV since 1977. Nevertheless, the club from the St. Pauli quarter relegated to the 2. Bundesliga at the end of the 2010/11 season.

Due the relegation of Hamburger SV into 2. Bundesliga in 2018, the Hamburg derbys become hosted often since this time again, now in the second-tier of the German football. The first-leg in the 2018-19 season become hosted in Volksparkstadion and ended with a goalless draw, the second-leg at Millerntor-Stadion has won by HSV with 4-0, the first victory of Hamburger SV in the ground of the arch-rival in a league match in 57 years. Nevertheless, HSV missed the return to Bundesliga and placed to the fourth rank. Afterwards, four of the next five fixtures in Hamburg derby won by FC St. Pauli and before the league match at Volksparkstadion in January 2022, the Kiezkicker was the leader of the table and was located before Hamburger SV, but HSV won 2-1 and won for the first time in over 20 years a home match at Hamburg derby. To the end of the 2021-22 season, FC St. Pauli missed the promotion to Bundesliga and placed at the fifth rank, Hamburger SV placed at the third rank and has qualified for this reasons for the promotion/relegation play-offs against Hertha Berlin. The first-leg won HSV 1-0, but he lost the second-leg with 0-2 and missed the promotion to Bundesliga.

Fans 
Since the 1980s the derby has not just determined the "number one in Hamburg" but is also seen as a clash of footballing and, to some, political ideologies.

HSV, with its multiple national and international trophies was, until 2018, the only club to play in the Bundesliga every year since its inception.

St. Pauli on the other hand has mostly played in lower divisions since 1963 and is often stylized as the financially limited underdog needing Uli Hoeness and Bayern Munich (along with a massive increase in marketing the club's alternative image to the mainstream) to save it from bankruptcy.

St Pauli's supporter base is noticeably more dogmatically left-wing. This is due to its popularity among squatters and counterculture subcultures of the local area in the 80s. In recent years, this has extended beyond Hamburg all across Germany and Europe to fans seeking a radical leftist club to whose mast they may nail their colours to. While the image of the club may even cause national security agencies to label St Pauli's pirate flag a symbol of extremism, the club's home games are now staged in a modern arena with more football hipsters in attendance than old-school squatters and anarchists.

So-called 'celebrity fans' of FC St Pauli include Ed Sheeran and Nigel Kennedy

Given the location of HSV's UEFA 4 star stadium, the Volksparkstadion , St. Pauli fans often mock HSV to be a Vorstadtverein (suburban club) or St. Ellingen as HSV's Volksparkstadion is located at the outskirts of Hamburg (in this case mistakenly attributed to the district of Stellingen, when it is actually in Bahrenfeld). Conversely, HSV supporters mock St. Pauli - in particular their popular slogan Hamburg ist braun-weiß (Hamburg is brown-white; their colors) - as a small club whose fans are regarded as being more interested in slogans than the game itself.

This divide was particularly political in the 1980s, when the HSV fan scene had a small contingent of organized neonazi groups. At the same time, squatters from the Hafenstrasse and Rote Flora started attending St. Pauli matches, thus creating the leftist fan scene the club is known for today.

Fortunately, nowadays HSV and its fans do more for the needy within the city and have a more inclusive fanbase. The fans organise shelter, food and warm clothing for the homeless during the winter break, the club sold T-shirts during the 2020 lockdown giving all proceeds to local businesses in the area surrounding the stadium to keep them afloat while they were missing the crowds they usually rely on. The bigger Hamburg team also has a better track record on promoting players of minority backgrounds to the first team, signing a refugee player and having a first team coach of colour.

Seeking a new bogeyman, St. Pauli's fans developed a new, politically similar rivalry with  Hansa Rostock in the 1990s. Given the support for right wing radicalism in the Rostock area, this would appear a more justifiable rivalry for the violent Antifa faction of St Pauli's fanbase.

In 2018, St. Pauli  fans attacked their rivals' choreography preparations, injuring two HSV ultras in the process. Indeed, the Millerntor stadium was used to shelter Anti-G20 demonstrators before the G20 summit   which subsequently turned into a riot across the city.

Latest results

All matches
As of 14 October 2022

References 

Association football rivalries in Germany
Hamburger SV
FC St. Pauli